Peters Glacier is a glacier in the Arctic National Wildlife Refuge in the U.S. state of Alaska. The glacier is on the west side of  Mount Chamberlin, one of the tallest mountains in the eastern end of the Brooks Range. The glacier was named in 1959 by the U.S. Air Force Cambridge Research Center for nearby Lake Peters.

See also
List of glaciers

References

Glaciers of Alaska
Glaciers of North Slope Borough, Alaska
Brooks Range